Be'sat Kermanshah Football Club is an Iranian football club based in Kermanshah, Iran. They currently compete in the Azadegan League.

Season-by-Season

The table below shows the achievements of the club in various competitions.

See also
 2015–16 Iran Football's 2nd Division

References

Football clubs in Iran
Association football clubs established in 2012
2012 establishments in Iran